Visa Electron is a debit card product that uses the Visa payment system. It is offered by issuing banks in every country with the exception of Canada, Australia, Argentina, Ireland and the United States. The difference between Visa Electron and Visa Debit, a similar product, is that payments with Visa Electron always require on-line electronic authorisation, and typically require that all the funds be available at the time of transfer, i.e., Visa Electron card accounts may not normally be overdrawn. Most Visa Debit cards, on the other hand, may be processed off-line without on-line authorisation and may allow transfers exceeding available funds up to a certain limit. For that reason, Visa Electron cards are more commonly issued to younger customers or customers that have poor credit. Some online stores and all offline terminals do not support Visa Electron because their systems cannot check for the availability of funds. In addition to point of sale debit payments, the card also allows the holder to withdraw cash from automated teller machines (ATMs) using the Plus interbank network.

In 2001, Banque Misr began offering the cards.

Many banks have migrated away from Visa Electron and instead issue Visa Debit cards; as such, Visa Electron issuance is declining.

Visa Electron will be discontinued globally by 2024.

Design
A Visa Electron logo, usually on the bottom right. Most Visa Electron cards do not have the dove hologram as on Visa credit and debit cards, but a few banks do include it.

The card number and validity as well as cardholder name are printed rather than embossed, thus the card cannot be used in a  card imprinter – for card-present transactions the card requires a reader of magnetic stripe cards, EMV reader or contactless payment terminal.

References

Financial services companies established in 1985
Debit cards
Debit card issuer associations
1985 establishments in the United States
Visa Inc.